2-Mercaptopyridine is an organosulfur compound with the formula HSC5H4N. This yellow crystalline solid is a derivative of pyridine.  The compound and its derivatives serve primarily as acylating agents.  A few of 2-mercaptopyridine’s other uses include serving as a protecting group for amines and imides as well as forming a selective reducing agent.  2-Mercaptopyridine oxidizes to 2,2’-dipyridyl disulfide.

Preparation 
2-Mercaptopyridine was originally synthesized in 1931 by heating 2-chloropyridine with calcium hydrogen sulfide.
ClC5H4N + Ca(SH)2 → HSC5H4N + Ca(SH)Cl

A more convenient route to 2-mercaptopyridine is the reaction of 2-chloropyridine and thiourea in ethanol and aqueous ammonia.

2-Mercaptopyridine derivatives can also be generated from precursors lacking preformed pyridine rings.  It arises for example in the condensation of α,β-unsaturated ketones, malononitrile, and 4-methylbenzenethiol under microwave irradiation.  The reaction is conducted with a base catalyst.

Structure and properties 
Similar in nature to 2-hydroxypyridine, 2-mercaptopyridine converts to the thione (or more accurately thioamide) tautomer.  The preferred form is dependent on temperature, concentration, and solvent.  The thione is favored at lower temperatures, lower concentrations, and in less polar solvents.  2-Mercaptopyridine is favored in dilute solutions and in solvents capable of hydrogen bonding.  These solvents will compete with other 2-mercaptopyridines to prevent self association.

The association constant for this reaction between mutual 2-mercaptopyridines is described below.  The ratio is of monosulfide to disulfide in chloroform.
Kassociation = (2.7±0.5)x103

Reactions
2-Mercaptopyridine oxidizes to 2,2’-dipyridyl disulfide. As amines are good catalysts for the oxidation of thiols to disulfides, this process is autocatalytic.

2-Mercaptopyridine can also be prepared by hydride reduction of 2,2’-dipyridyl disulfide.
C5H4NSSC5H4N + 2H → 2HSC5H4N

Main reactions 
2-Mercaptopyridine and the disulfide are chelating ligands.  2-mercaptopyridine forms the indium(III) complex In(PyS)3 complexes in supercritical carbon dioxide.  2-Mercaptopyridine may also be used to coat porous media in order to purify plasmid DNA of impurities such as RNA and proteins at relatively quick timescales to similar methods.  2-Mercaptopyridine is also used acylate phenols, amines, and carboxylic acids.

Another application lies in metal-free catalysis: 2-mercaptopyridine can be used as a catalyst for isodesmic C-H borylation of heteroarenes. The particular pattern of Lewis base and Brønsted acid allows to cleave boron-carbons bonds and then form a new boron-carbon bond by lewis pair mediated C-H activation.

References 

2-Pyridyl compounds
Thiols
Thioamides